This page lists the rosters, by season, of the UCI Women's Team, .

2021
Ages as of 1 January 2021

2018
Ages as of 1 January 2018.

2017
Ages as of 1 January 2017.

References

Lists of cyclists by team